The DIO Implant LA Open is a women's professional golf tournament in Los Angeles, California on the LPGA Tour. A new event in 2018, it is played at Wilshire Country Club. 

In 2023, the tournament moves to Palos Verdes Golf Club in Los Angeles, played March 30 – April 2. It will feature a field of 144 players, and an increase in purse of $250,000 to $1,750,000.

Tournament names
2018: Hugel-JTBC LA Open
2019–2021: Hugel-Air Premia LA Open
2022: DIO Implant LA Open

Winners

Tournament records

References

External links

Coverage on the LPGA Tour's official site

LPGA Tour events
Golf in Los Angeles 
Recurring sporting events established in 2018
2018 establishments in California
Women's sports in California